Dolores "Lola" García-Hierro Caraballo is a Spanish politician. From 2011 to 2014, she served as a Member of the European Parliament, representing Spain for the Spanish Socialist Workers Party. He was also city councillor of Madrid, member of the Congress of Deputies as well as member of the Assembly of Madrid, and senator.

References

1958 births
Living people
MEPs for Spain 2009–2014
21st-century women MEPs for Spain
Spanish Socialist Workers' Party MEPs
People from Toledo, Spain
Members of the Congress of Deputies (Spain)
Madrid city councillors (1987–1991)
Members of the 1st Assembly of Madrid
Members of the 3rd Assembly of Madrid
Members of the 4th Assembly of Madrid
Members of the Socialist Parliamentary Group (Assembly of Madrid)